Albert Frederick Totzke (December 20, 1882 – October 17, 1951) was a pharmacist and political figure in Saskatchewan, Canada. He represented Vonda in the Legislative Assembly of Saskatchewan from 1908 to 1917 and Humboldt in the House of Commons of Canada from 1925 to 1935 as a Liberal.

He was born in Berlin, Ontario (later Kitchener, Ontario), the son of Carl Totzke, and was educated there, at the Ontario School of Pharmacy and the University of Toronto. In 1907, Totzke married Evelyn Lynch.

References 

Members of the House of Commons of Canada from Saskatchewan
Liberal Party of Canada MPs
Politicians from Kitchener, Ontario
Saskatchewan Liberal Party MLAs
1882 births
1951 deaths